The 2000/01 FIS Ski Jumping Continental Cup was the 10th in a row (8th official) Continental Cup winter season in ski jumping for men. For the first time in history of this competition team events were introduced.

Other competitive circuits this season included the World Cup and Grand Prix.

Calendar

Men

Men's team

Standings

Men

Europa Cup vs. Continental Cup 
This was originally last Europa Cup season and is also recognized as the first Continental Cup season by International Ski Federation although under this name began its first official season in 1993/94.

References

FIS Ski Jumping Continental Cup
2000 in ski jumping
2001 in ski jumping